Bayer 04 Leverkusen had a shocking season, in which it went from being in the final of the UEFA Champions League the previous season, to finish 15th in Bundesliga, only just escaping relegation to the second tier. It also went out of the Champions League in the second group stage, not even clinching a single point.

Players

First-team squad
Squad at end of season

Out on loan

Reserve team

Bundesliga

Matches

 Energie Cottbus-Bayer Leverkusen 1–1
 0–1 Jan Šimák (63)
 1–1 Vilmos Sebők (80)
 Bayer Leverkusen-Borussia Dortmund 1–1
 1–0 Diego Placente (23)
 1–1 Jan Koller (61)
 Bayer Leverkusen-Bochum 2–4
 1–0 Jan Šimák (8)
 1–1 Thordur Gudjonsson (13)
 1–2 Dariusz Wosz (33)
 1–3 Frank Fahrenhorst (44)
 1–4 Thomas Christiansen (60)
 2–4 França (76)
 Hansa Rostock-Bayer Leverkusen 1–3
 0–1 Oliver Neuville (5)
 0–2 Thomas Brdarić (22)
 1–2 Jochen Kientz (75)
 1–3 Bernd Schneider (88)
 Bayer Leverkusen-Hannover 1–3
 1–0 Yıldıray Baştürk (11)
 1–1 Fredi Bobić (41)
 1–2 Fredi Bobić (80)
 1–3 Mohamadou Idrissou (83)
 Werder Bremen-Bayer Leverkusen 3–2
 0–1 Thomas Brdarić (11)
 1–1 Ailton (25 pen)
 2–1 Angelos Charisteas (27)
 3–1 Angelos Charisteas (32)
 3–2 Paul Stalteri (42 og)
 Bayer Leverkusen-Bayern Munich 2–1
 1–0 Lúcio (9)
 2–0 Daniel Bierofka (63)
 2–1 Hasan Salihamidžić (89)
 Wolfsburg-Bayer Leverkusen 2–0
 1–0 Tomislav Marić (6)
 2–0 Stefan Effenberg (64)
 Bayer Leverkusen-Kaiserslautern 1–0
 1–0 Thomas Brdarić (19)
 Hertha Berlin-Bayer Leverkusen 1–1
 1–0 Arne Friedrich (20)
 1–1 Juan (54)
 Bayer Leverkusen-Stuttgart 0–1
 0–1 Silvio Meißner (19)
 Schalke 04-Bayer Leverkusen 0–1
 0–1 Bernd Schneider (90 pen)
 Bayer Leverkusen-Mönchengladbach 2–2
 0–1 Igor Demo (25)
 1–1 Daniel Bierofka (29)
 1–2 Bernd Korzynietz (70)
 2–2 Daniel Bierofka (87)
 Arminia Bielefeld-Bayer Leverkusen 2–2
 0–1 Thomas Brdarić (17)
 1–1 Artur Wichniarek (26)
 1–2 Boris Živković (69)
 2–2 Artur Wichniarek (83)
 Bayer Leverkusen-Hamburg 2–3
 0–1 Bernardo Romeo (3)
 1–1 Hanno Balitsch (11)
 2–1 Yıldıray Baştürk (21)
 2–2 Bernardo Romeo (52)
 2–3 Sergej Barbarez (76)
 1860 Munich-Bayer Leverkusen 0–3
 0–1 Daniel Bierofka (10)
 0–2 Dimitar Berbatov (51)
 0–3 Oliver Neuville (89)
 Bayer Leverkusen-Nürnberg 0–2
 0–1 Saša Ćirić (59)
 0–2 Júnior (88)
 Bayer Leverkusen-Energie Cottbus 0–3
 0–1 Marcel Gebhardt (15)
 0–2 Marko Topić (32)
 0–3 Andrzej Juskowiak (85)
 Borussia Dortmund-Bayer Leverkusen 2–0
 1–0 Ewerthon (3)
 2–0 Jan Koller (29)
 Bochum-Bayer Leverkusen 2–1
 1–0 Vahid Hashemian (69)
 1–1 Marko Babić (78)
 2–1 Vahid Hashemian (84)
 Bayer Leverkusen-Hansa Rostock 1–2
 0–1 Bachirou Salou (35)
 1–1 Marko Babić (38)
 1–2 Bachirou Salou (41)
 Hannover-Bayer Leverkusen 1–2
 1–0 Gheorghe Popescu (14)
 1–1 Sebastian Schoof (80)
 1–2 Jan Šimák (90)
 Bayer Leverkusen-Werder Bremen 3–0
 1–0 Daniel Bierofka (11)
 2–0 Sebastian Schoof (50)
 3–0 Juan (61)
 Bayern Munich-Bayer Leverkusen 3–0
 1–0 Claudio Pizarro (2)
 2–0 Giovane Élber (22)
 3–0 Giovane Élber (75)
 Bayer Leverkusen-Wolfsburg 1–1
 1–0 Carsten Ramelow (68)
 1–1 Tomislav Marić (81)
 Kaiserslautern-Bayer Leverkusen 1–0
 1–0 Miroslav Klose (40)
 Bayer Leverkusen-Hertha Berlin 4–1
 1–0 Hans-Jörg Butt (14)
 2–0 Bernd Schneider (32)
 3–0 Oliver Neuville (41)
 4–0 Oliver Neuville (70)
 4–1 Michael Preetz (76)
 Stuttgart-Bayer Leverkusen 3–0
 1–0 Ioannis Amanatidis (9)
 2–0 Alexander Hleb (17)
 3–0 Ioan Ganea (50)
 Bayer Leverkusen-Schalke 04 1–3
 1–0 Dimitar Berbatov (9)
 1–1 Jörg Böhme (12)
 1–2 Ebbe Sand (61)
 1–3 Gerald Asamoah (90)
 Mönchengladbach-Bayer Leverkusen 2–2
 1–0 Igor Demo (6)
 1–1 Daniel Bierofka (17)
 1–2 Dimitar Berbatov (47)
 2–2 Morten Skoubo (89)
 Bayer Leverkusen-Arminia Bielefeld 3–1
 0–1 Ansgar Brinkmann (34 pen)
 1–1 Lúcio (38)
 2–1 Lúcio (69)
 3–1 Hanno Balitsch (71)
 Hamburg-Bayer Leverkusen 4–1
 1–0 Sergej Barbarez (18)
 2–0 Bernardo Romeo (55)
 2–1 Hanno Balitsch (88)
 3–1 Lars Jacobsen (90)
 4–1 Erik Meijer (90)
 Bayer Leverkusen-1860 Munich 3–0
 1–0 Daniel Bierofka (8)
 2–0 Dimitar Berbatov (44)
 3–0 Marko Babić (48)
 Nürnberg-Bayer Leverkusen 0–1
 0–1 Yıldıray Baştürk (35)

Topscorers
  Daniel Bierofka 7
  Dimitar Berbatov 4
  Oliver Neuville 4

Champions League

1st Group Stage

 Olympiacos-Bayer Leverkusen 6–2
 0–1 Bernd Schneider (22)
 1–1 Giovanni (27)
 2–1 Stelios Giannakopoulos (38)
 3–1 Predrag Đorđević (44)
 4–1 Predrag Đorđević (64 pen)
 5–1 Predrag Đorđević (73)
 5–2 Bernd Schneider (78 pen)
 6–2 Pär Zetterberg (87)
 Bayer Leverkusen-Manchester United 1–2
 0–1 Ruud van Nistelrooy (31)
 0–2 Ruud van Nistelrooy (44)
 1–2 Dimitar Berbatov (52)
 Maccabi Haifa-Bayer Leverkusen 0–2
 0–1 Marko Babić (31)
 0–2 Marko Babić (62)
 Bayer Leverkusen-Maccabi Haifa 2–1
 1–0 Marko Babić (45)
 1–1 Nenad Pralija (53)
 2–1 Juan (67)
 Bayer Leverkusen-Olympiacos 2–0
 1–0 Juan (15)
 2–0 Bernd Schneider (89 pen)
 Manchester United-Bayer Leverkusen 2–0
 1–0 Juan Sebastián Verón (42)
 2–0 Ruud van Nistelrooy (69)

2nd Group Stage

 Bayer Leverkusen-Barcelona 1–2
 1–0 Dimitar Berbatov (39)
 1–1 Javier Saviola (48)
 1–2 Marc Overmars (88)
 Inter-Bayer Leverkusen 3–2
 1–0 Luigi Di Biagio (14)
 2–0 Luigi Di Biagio (27)
 2–1 Boris Živković (62)
 3–1 Hans-Jörg Butt (80 og)
 3–2 França (90)
 Bayer Leverkusen-Newcastle 1–3
 0–1 Shola Ameobi (5)
 0–2 Shola Ameobi (15)
 1–2 França (25)
 1–3 Lomana Lua Lua (32)
 Newcastle-Bayer Leverkusen 3–1
 1–0 Alan Shearer (5)
 2–0 Alan Shearer (11)
 3–0 Alan Shearer (36 pen)
 3–1 Marko Babić (73)
 Barcelona-Bayer Leverkusen 2–0
 1–0 Javier Saviola (16)
 2–0 Thomas Kleine (49 og)
 Bayer Leverkusen-Inter 0–2
 0–1 Obafemi Martins (36)
 0–2 Emre Belözoğlu (90)

Kits

References

Notes

Bayer 04 Leverkusen seasons
Bayer Leverkusen